The Sea Battle (German: Die Seeschlacht) is a 1917 German silent war film directed by Richard Oswald and starring Emil Jannings, Werner Krauss and Conrad Veidt. Comparatively little is known about the production, which is now a lost film.

Cast
 Emil Jannings
 Werner Krauss
 Conrad Veidt

References

Bibliography
 Jerry C. Allen. Conrad Veidt: from Caligari to Casablanca. Boxwood Press, 1987.

External links

1917 films
Films of the German Empire
German silent feature films
Films directed by Richard Oswald
German black-and-white films
1917 drama films
German drama films
Lost German films
1917 lost films
Lost drama films
Silent drama films
1910s German films